The score to the movie The Good Thief was produced and arranged by Elliot Goldenthal; whilst the score music is generally received favourably one major complaint is that it is too short and that the other tracks supersede Goldenthal's scoring work, it contains eight pieces by him and other artists including Cheb Khaled, Serge Gainsbourg, Johnny Hallyday and Bono; the song Bono covers is the Frank Sinatra song "That's Life", produced, with a string arrangement, by Goldenthal. The original score cues were performed by both The London Metropolitan Orchestra and The Irish Film Orchestra.

Track listing 
 "Minuit" (5:50) - Cheb Khaled
 "Lucky Eyes" (2:30) - Elliot Goldenthal
 "A Thousand Kisses Deep" (6:27) - Leonard Cohen
 "Endorphin Spoon" (1:54) - Elliot Goldenthal
 "Verite" (6:06) - Rachid Taha
 "Ouverture Francais" (1:54) - Elliot Goldenthal
 "Parisian Du Nord" (3:31) - Cheb Mami and K-Mel
 "Snake 5" (3:10) - Elliot Goldenthal
 "Noir C'est Noir" (3:15) - Johnny Hallyday
 "Waltz for Anna" (1:30) - Elliot Goldenthal
 "Flashback" (6:21) - Intense
 "36 Hadjini Street" (1:50) - Elliot Goldenthal
 "Je T'Aime... Moi Non Plus" (4:22) - Serge Gainsbourg with Jane Birkin
 "Confession to JC with Love" (1:17) - Elliot Goldenthal
 "That's Life" (3:55) - Bono
 "Redemption Rehearsal" (8:38) - Elliot Goldenthal

References

External links
 link to review

Elliot Goldenthal soundtracks
2002 soundtrack albums